generally refers to a liturgical prayer in honor of the Lamb of God, as used in Christian theology. It also refers to liturgical music which accompanies this prayer as part of a Mass setting.

It may also refer to:

 Agnus Dei (Barber), a 1967 choral composition
 "Agnus Dei", a song from the Michael W. Smith album Go West Young Man
 Agnus Dei (film), a film by Anne Fontaine
 Agnus Dei (Zurbarán), a painting